DJ Paul is an American rapper, record producer and DJ

DJ Paul may also refer to:
DJ Pauly D, American television personality and DJ
DJ Paul Elstak, Dutch hardcore DJ
Paul Oakenfold, English record producer and trance DJ
Paul van Dyk, German DJ and record producer
Paul Rudd, English house music DJ
Paul Woolford, English dance music DJ
Paul Taylor, Scottish electronic DJ
Paul Banks, English-American musician and DJ
Paul Newton, English dance music DJ
Paul Miller, American hip-hop DJ
Paul Johnson, American house DJ
Paul Flynn, English dance music DJ
Tall Paul, English DJ
Joshua Paul Davis, American record producer and DJ